Viktor Balyutovich Kumykov (born 25 June 1963) is a Russian professional football coach and a former player. He is the manager of the Kazakh club Kaisar.

Manager career
Kumykov resigned as Shakhter Karagandy manager in November 2014.

Personal life
His sons Alim Kumykov and Artur Kumykov played football professionally.

References

External links
 Viktor Kumykov at Footballdatabase

1963 births
Sportspeople from Nalchik
Living people
Soviet footballers
FC Rotor Volgograd players
PFC Spartak Nalchik players
Russian football managers
Russian expatriate football managers
Expatriate football managers in Kazakhstan
Expatriate football managers in Uzbekistan
Expatriate football managers in Belarus
PFC Spartak Nalchik managers
FC Avtozapchast Baksan managers
FC Okzhetpes managers
FC Yelimai managers
FC Kaisar Kyzylorda managers
FC Mash'al Mubarek managers
FC Nasaf managers
FC Shakhter Karagandy managers
FC Ordabasy managers
FC Atyrau managers
FK Andijan managers
FC Sputnik Rechitsa managers
Russian expatriate sportspeople in Kazakhstan
Association football goalkeepers
Russian expatriate sportspeople in Uzbekistan
Russian expatriate sportspeople in Belarus